Castellvi or Castellví may refer to:

People
Francesc de Castellví, co-author of Scachs d'amor
José María Castellví, Catalan film director
Vilmarie Castellvi, Puerto Rican tennis player

Places
Castellví de Rosanes, municipality in the comarca of the Baix Llobregat
Castellví de la Marca, municipality in the comarca of Alt Penedès
Castellvi Peak, peak on Hurd Peninsula, Livingston Island